The 1918 United States Senate election in Oklahoma took place on November 5, 1918. Incumbent Senator Robert L. Owen, a Democrat, sought re-election in his first popular election. He won the Democratic primary in a landslide and faced former U.S. Attorney W. B. Johnson in the general election. Owen won re-election by a wide margin.

Democratic primary

Candidates
 Robert L. Owen, incumbent U.S. Senator
 Robert Galbreath Jr., oilman

Results

Republican primary

Candidates
 W. B. Johnson, former U.S. Attorney

Results

Socialist Primary

Candidates
 C. M. Greenland

Results

General election

Results

References

Oklahoma
1918
1918 Oklahoma elections